Aigialaceae is a family of marine fungi belonging to the order Pleosporales. Suetrong et al introduced this family in 2009.

References

Pleosporales
Dothideomycetes families